CityOn Zhengzhou Shopping Center is a shopping mall on Nongye E. Road in Zhengdong New Area, Zhengzhou, China. It was opened on 16 March 2017.

Features

The mall mainly features some fast fashion brands, including H&M, Zara, Massimo Dutti, Bershka, Oysho, Stradivarius, Zara Home, Uniqlo, etc. Restaurants are located on B1 level and the L3 and L4 levels.

References

Shopping malls in Zhengzhou
Shopping malls established in 2017
Taubman Centers
2017 establishments in China